The United States House of Representatives elections in California, 1886 was an election for California's delegation to the United States House of Representatives, which occurred as part of the general election of the House of Representatives on November 2, 1886. Democrats gained one district.

Overview

Delegation Composition

Results

District 1

District 2

District 3

District 4

District 5

District 6

See also
50th United States Congress
Political party strength in California
Political party strength in U.S. states
United States House of Representatives elections, 1886

References
California Elections Page
Office of the Clerk of the House of Representatives

External links
California Legislative District Maps (1911-Present)
RAND California Election Returns: District Definitions

1886
California United States House of Representatives
1886 California elections